Emilio Gentile (born 1946, in Bojano) is an Italian historian and professor, specializing in the history, ideology, and culture of Italian fascism. Gentile is considered one of Italy's foremost cultural historians of Fascist Italy and its ideology. He studied under the renowned Italian historian Renzo De Felice and wrote a book about him.

Gentile serves as Professor of History at the Sapienza University of Rome. He considers fascism a form of political religion. He also applied the theory of political religion to the United States in the essay Politics as Religion (2006) regarding the sacralization of politics in the aftermath of the September 11 attacks. In 2003, Gentile was awarded the Hans Sigrist Prize.

Works 
 Storia del partito fascista. 1919-1922. Movimento e milizia. 1989
 Il culto del littorio. La sacralizzazione della politica nell'Italia fascista. Rome/Bari. 1993
 English translation: The Sacralization of Politics in Fascist Italy, 1996, Harvard University Press, hup.harvard.edu
 Le religioni della politica. Fra democrazie e totalitarismi. Laterza, Rome 2001
 English translation: 
 Fascismo. Storia e interpretazione. Rome/Bari. 2002
 Il mito dello Stato nuovo. Dal radicalismo nazionale al fascismo. 2002
 Le origini dell'Italia contemporanea. L'età giolittiana. 2003
 Renzo De Felice. Lo storico e il personaggio. 2003
 Il fascismo in tre capitoli. 2006
 La Grande Italia. Il mito della nazione nel XX secolo. 2006
 English translation: 
La democrazia di Dio. La religione americana nell'era dell'impero e del terrore, Roma-Bari, Laterza, 2006. .
 English translation: 
 Il fascino del persecutore. George Mosse e i totalitarismi. Carocci. 2007
 L'apocalisse della modernità. La grande guerra per l'uomo nuovo. Mondadori. 2008
Contro Cesare. Cristianesimo e totalitarismo nell'epoca dei fascismi, Milano, Feltrinelli, 2010. .
Né stato né nazione. Italiani senza meta, Roma-Bari, Laterza, 2010. .
Italiani senza padri. Intervista sul Risorgimento, Roma-Bari, Laterza, 2011. .
E fu subito regime. Il fascismo e la marcia su Roma, Roma-Bari, Laterza, 2012. .

References

1946 births
20th-century Italian educators
20th-century Italian essayists
20th-century Italian historians
21st-century Italian educators
21st-century Italian historians
Cultural historians
Historians of fascism
Historians of Italy
Historians of World War I
Historians of World War II
Living people
People from the Province of Campobasso
Academic staff of the Sapienza University of Rome